Stewart–Treves syndrome refers to a lymphangiosarcoma, a rare disorder marked by the presence of an angiosarcoma (a malignant tumor of blood or lymph vessels) in a person with chronic (long-term) lymphedema. Although it most commonly refers to malignancies associated with chronic lymphedema resulting from mastectomy and/or radiotherapy for breast cancer, it may also describe lymphangiosarcomas that result from congenital and other causes of chronic secondary lymphedema.  Lymphangiosarcoma arising from cancer-related lymphedema has become much less common with better surgical techniques, radiation therapy, and conservative treatment. The prognosis, even with wide surgical excision and subsequent radiotherapy, is poor.

Cause
Common risk factors that may lead to the development of lymphangiosarcoma include lymphatic blockage, radiotherapy, mastectomy, cardiovascular diseases, and hypertension. The sarcoma first appears as a bruise mark, a purplish discoloration or a tender skin nodule in the extremity, typically on the anterior surface.

 Lymphangiosarcoma is caused by chronic lymphedema.
 Causes of lymphedema include:
 Primary lymphedema
 Congenital
 Precox (adolescence)
 Tarda (adulthood)
 Secondary lymphedema
 Malignancy
 Recurrent cellulitis
 Connective tissue disease
 Infection (filariasis)
 Contact dermatitis
 Lymphatic damage (surgery, radiation therapy, burns, etc.).

Treatment 
The treatment of choice is a large resection or amputation of the affected limb. Radiation therapy can precede or follow surgical treatment. Tumors that have advanced locally or have metastasized can be treated with mono or polychemotherapy, systemically or locally. However, chemotherapy and radiation therapy have not been shown to improve survivorship significantly.
In cases of upper limbs, forequarter amputation (disarticulation of upperlimb along with clavicle and scapula) is preferred.

Prognosis 
Early detection is key. Prognosis is generally poor, and the 5 year survival rate of patients with lymphangiosarcoma is less than 5%.

Incidence 
In the 1960s, the incidence five years after a radical mastectomy varied from 0.07% to 0.45%.
Today, it occurs in 0.03% of patients surviving 10 or more years after radical mastectomy.

History
It was discovered by Fred W. Stewart and Norman Treves in 1948.

See also 
 Angiosarcoma
 List of cutaneous conditions
 Lymphangiosarcoma
 Lymphedema
 Postcardiotomy syndrome

References

External links 

Breast cancer
Vascular diseases
Vascular-related cutaneous conditions
Syndromes affecting the breast